Harrison Township is one of seventeen townships in Boone County, Iowa, USA.  As of the 2000 census, its population was 368.

History
Harrison Township was organized in 1871. It is named for William Henry Harrison, ninth President of the United States.

Geography
According to the USGS, it contains three cemeteries: Mackey, Saint Paul's Lutheran and Saints Peter and Paul.

References

External links
 US-Counties.com
 City-Data.com

Townships in Boone County, Iowa
Townships in Iowa
1871 establishments in Iowa